The Arrogant Sons of Bitches (commonly abbreviated as ASOB) was a 6-piece ska punk band from Long Island and Baldwin, New York. The band was known for its strong DIY punk roots, self-releasing two albums and two EPs. Their final album, Three Cheers For Disappointment, was released on Kill Normal Records.

Frontman Jeff Rosenstock went on to found Quote Unquote Records, a donation-based record label, as well as the band Bomb the Music Industry!  Other members went on to join Jay Tea, Hello Nurse, Let Me Crazy, and The Rocky Sullivans.

History

In 1995, Joe Werfelman and Jeff Rosenstock started playing Green Day cover songs together. More members gradually joined their band, and in 1998 they recorded their first album, Released on Breaking the Law Records and titled Built to Fail.  Following Built to Fail, the band experienced some success and played with bands such as Edna's Goldfish, Catch 22, and The Toasters. In 2000 they released their second album, Pornocracy.

At this point, many ASOB members quit the band to attend college. In 2003 the band decided to follow the Warped Tour, playing outside of the venues. After a while they were invited into the tour.

In 2004 the band completed recording most of the album Three Cheers For Disappointment. At this point the band was starting to break up, and Jeff started a new band, Bomb the Music Industry!  The album was finally released in 2006, and the band broke up officially.

However, in 2007 ASOB announced a farewell show for their fans at The Knitting Factory. The show sold out in under seven hours, an unprecedented phenomenon for the show's venue. A second farewell show was played the following night at the Crazy Donkey in Farmingdale, New York.

Five years later, the band reunited for a set of shows in New York. Jeff explained: "We like each other again, and thought it would be fun to play together again. This show is a one time thing. There are absolutely no plans to make another record, to go on a big tour anywhere or anything like that."

Throughout their career, ASOB was praised for their high-energy live performances.  One reviewer described that, "They're climbing on the ceiling, the keyboardist would be jumping up and down on the keyboard swinging from hanging speakers, and the bassist would stage dive in an empty spot... land straight on his face, and keep rocking out as he had the time of his life."

Band members

Discography

Music videos
 So Let's Go! NOWHERE (2006)

References

External links 
 ASOB on Discogs
 Official Facebook profile
 Official Myspace profile

Musical groups from Long Island
Musical groups disestablished in 2006
Third-wave ska groups
Musical groups established in 1995
Musical groups from New York (state)
American ska punk musical groups